Lafayette Square (officially Evans Bank @ Lafayette Square since November 8, 2019 for sponsorship purposes) is a Buffalo Metro Rail station near City Hall and is near the center of the Buffalo Central Business District at Lafayette Square located in the 400 block of Main Street (between Lafayette Square and Mohawk Streets) in the Free Fare Zone, which allows passengers free travel between Erie Canal Harbor station and Fountain Plaza station. Passengers continuing northbound past Fountain Plaza are required to have proof-of-payment. Lafayette Square station is the closest to the Buffalo & Erie County Public Library, located one block east at Washington and Clinton Streets. On February 28, 2019, The Buffalo News announced that Evans Bank, which opened its downtown headquarters in the Main-Court Building the previous October, bought the naming rights to the station for nearly $161,000 for five years and nearly $352,000 if extended to 10 years.

Bus routes
 At Court and Main Streets (heading east only):
 1 William
 2 Clinton
 4 Broadway
 At Court and Pearl Streets (heading east, west or south):
 1 William
 2 Clinton
 3 Grant (inbound)
 4 Broadway
 5 Niagara-Kenmore (inbound)
 7 Baynes-Richmond (inbound)
 8 Main (inbound)
 11 Colvin (inbound)
 20 Elmwood (inbound)
 25 Delaware (inbound)
 40 Grand Island (inbound)
 60 Niagara Falls (inbound)
 61 North Tonawanda (inbound)
 64 Lockport (inbound)
 66 Williamsville 
 67 Cleveland Hill
 68 George Urban (inbound)
 69 Alden (outbound)
 74 Hamburg (outbound)
 79 Tonawanda (inbound)
 81 Eastside (inbound)
 204 Airport-Downtown Express
 At Lafayette Square and Washington Street (heading south only):
 6 Sycamore (inbound)
 14 Abbott (outbound)
 16 South Park (outbound)
 24 Genesee (inbound)
 42 Lackawanna (outbound)
 70 East Aurora (outbound)
 72 Orchard Park (outbound)
 74 Hamburg (inbound)
 76 Lotus Bay (inbound)

Notable places nearby

Lafayette Square station is located near:
 Broadway Garage (former Broadway Auditorium)
 Buffalo City Hall
 Buffalo Niagara Convention Center
 Buffalo & Erie County Public Library (Central Branch)
 Hotel Lafayette
 Liberty Building
 Main Place Tower
 Rand Building
 Statler Hotel (now Statler Towers)

See also
 List of Buffalo Metro Rail stations

References

Buffalo Metro Rail stations
Railway stations in the United States opened in 1984
1984 establishments in New York (state)